Big Ben (April 20, 1976 – December 11, 1999) was a world champion show jumping horse.

Birth and acquisition by Ian Millar
First named "Winston", Big Ben was born at the van Hooydonk Farm in Kalmthout (northern Belgium). Soon after, he was purchased for Canadian equestrian Ian Millar for $45,000 and permanently relocated to Millar Brooke Farm in Perth, Ontario, Canada. Several lucrative offers were made to buy Big Ben throughout his career, but the ownership group, as well as Ian Millar, had such a strong bond with him that they refused all offers.

Career
In 1984, the horse began competing in show jumping events, touching off what would become a long and successful career. Millar rode Big Ben to more than 40 Grand Prix titles including six Spruce Meadows Derbys, as well as taking the world cup show jumping championship two years in a row - the first World Cup Final coming at Gothenburg, Sweden in 1988, and then again the next year in Tampa, Florida. In 1989 he won the Grand Prix of Bordeaux, France and the Grand Prix of Stuttgart, Germany, ranking Millar number one in the world. Millar and Big Ben also won the du Maurier International twice, in 1987 and 1991, the world's richest grand prix event at that time.

In 1992 Big Ben survived two bouts with colic and an accident in which his horse trailer overturned on a highway after a head-on collision with a car. Two other horses died, and a third became unrideable due to its injuries. A fourth would never enter a trailer again. Big Ben won a Grand Prix only 2 months later. After much talk about his mounting injuries, he would go on to win his sixth Spruce Meadows Derby in front of 50,000 spectators. This was his final derby appearance.

Retirement and death

After 11 years of competition, Big Ben was retired to Millar Brooke Farm in 1994. On December 11, 1999, two veterinarians informed Millar that Big Ben was suffering from a third, untreatable case of colic. He was euthanized at Millar Brooke Farm at 23 years of age. He was buried on a knoll overlooking the farm.

Honours and memorials
In 1999, Big Ben was recognised as a Canadian icon when Canada Post honoured him with his own stamp. Big Ben was inducted into the Ontario Sports Hall of Fame and joined Thoroughbred racehorse Northern Dancer as the only other horse in the Canadian Sports Hall of Fame. His story is told in the book titled "Big Ben", by author Lawrence Scanlan.

In 2000, Big Ben's personal groom, Sandra Patterson, wrote a tribute to Big Ben in the book titled "An Apple a Day: A Heartwarming Collection of True Horse Stories" edited by Kimberly Gatto. In 2005, the Perth and District Chamber of Commerce erected a bronze statue of Big Ben, with Ian Millar riding, in a park on the banks of the Tay River in downtown Perth, Ontario. Big Ben's image lives on as a Breyer model horse.

In 2011, a book titled Unbridled Passion: Show Jumping's Greatest Horses and Riders, written by Jeff Papows, featured Big Ben and his owner and rider, Ian Millar. The book documented the challenges, such as the two bouts of life-threatening colic surgery, that Big Ben faced inside and outside the competitive ring. It features original research and interviews with Ian Miller and Big Ben's personal groom, Sandi Patterson.

Achievements
 Won over $1.5 million in prize money
 First horse to win 2 consecutive World Cup Final titles 1988 Gothenburg and 1989 Tampa, Florida
 Team and  Individual Gold medals at the 1987 Pan Am Games, Indianapolis
 Member of the 4th place Team at the 1984 Olympics in Los Angeles
 2nd World Cup Finals in 1986 Gothenburg
 5th World Cup Finals in 1987 Paris
 Member of the 4th place Team at the Show Jumping World Championships, Aachen
 Winner of Masters Grand Prix  at Spruce Meadows in 1987 and 1991
 Member of the 4th place Team at the 1988 Olympics in Seoul
 Winner of Grand Prix of Stuttgart 1989
 Winner of Grand Prix of Bordeaux 1989
 Canadian National Show Jumping Champion 1988, 1991 and 1993
 Won the Spruce Meadows Derby 6 times in eight years (the Chrysler Classic in '86,'87 and '89 and the Shell Cup in '91,'92 and '93)
 One of only two horses inducted into the Canadian Sports Hall of Fame.

See also
 List of historical horses

References

External links 
"Big Ben". The Canadian Encyclopedia.
Big Ben pedigree & photo

Canadian show jumping horses
1976 animal births
1999 animal deaths
Individual male horses
Belgian Warmbloods